Henry Thomas Foley, 5th Baron Foley of Kidderminster DL (4 December 1850 – 17 December 1905), was a British peer.

Foley was the son of Thomas Foley, 4th Baron Foley, and Lady Mary Charlotte Howard, the daughter of Henry Howard, 13th Duke of Norfolk. When his father died in 1869, he inherited his title and wealth.

In 1872, Foley purchased a considerable amount of land at Claygate, Surrey. At the core of this was Ruxley Lodge, "...a delightful family mansion moderate in size, but replete with comfort and convenience..." Lord Foley added the west wing, with its octagonal tower, turrets and gargoyles making it almost twice as large. The castellated building was renamed Ruxley Towers. Foley created extensive housing developments in Claygate with the coming of the railway in the area of Foley Road and Fitzalan Road (named after his brother).

Foley married Evelyne Vaughan Radford, daughter of Arthur Radford, on 25 October 1899 in London. They had no children and when he died at Ruxley Lodge aged 55, he was succeeded by his brother, Lord Fitzalan Charles John Foley, 6th Baron Foley.

References 

Foley, Henry Foley, 5th Baron Foley
Foley, Henry Foley, 5th Baron Foley
Deputy Lieutenants of Surrey
Henry
5